Frederik Vanderbiest (born 10 October 1977) is a Belgian football manager and former player who is currently assistant manager at KV Mechelen.

Career
Born in Vilvoorde, Belgium, Vanderbiest began playing football in R.W.D. Molenbeek's youth system before he joined the senior side. He played for K.S.V. Roeselare from 2001 to 2007, where he was twice voted player of the year by the club's supporters.

In 2013, he guided K.V. Oostende into the quarter finals of the Belgian Cup and won promotion to the Belgian Pro League by winning the 2012–13 Belgian Second Division.

References

1977 births
Living people
People from Vilvoorde
Association football midfielders
Belgian footballers
K.S.V. Roeselare players
Royale Union Saint-Gilloise players
F.C.V. Dender E.H. players
Oud-Heverlee Leuven players
K.V. Oostende players
Belgian football managers
K.V. Oostende managers
Cercle Brugge K.S.V. managers
Royal Antwerp F.C. managers
Aris Limassol FC managers
Lierse S.K. managers
K.S.V. Roeselare managers
K.V. Mechelen managers
R. Wallonia Walhain Chaumont-Gistoux players
Footballers from Flemish Brabant